"On Being the Right Size" is a 1926 essay by J. B. S. Haldane which discusses proportions in the animal world and the essential link between the size of an animal and these systems an animal has for life.
It was published as one of Haldane's collected essays in Possible Worlds and Other Essays.

Thesis
Haldane's thesis is that sheer size very often defines what bodily equipment an animal must have:

Many of his examples are based on the square–cube law, although he does not use that terminology.

The bigger an animal gets, the more it would have to change its physical shape, but the weaker it would become.

Influence
This link has become known as Haldane's principle (not to be confused with Richard Burton Haldane's Haldane principle), being referred to as such by urban planning theorist Jane Jacobs.

Another planning theorist, Christopher Alexander, refers to this principle in his theory of Independent Regions in A Pattern Language, citing Haldane:

Notes

External links

 
On Being the Right Size - site with the text of the essay. 

1926 essays
1926 in biology
Evolutionary biology literature
Works by J. B. S. Haldane